K. Padmanabhan Nair (1919–1990) was an Indian film director, scriptwriter in Malayalam movies. He did dialogue, story and script for almost 20 movies and directed 5 Malayalam movies during the 1960s. He is a recipient of the Kerala Sangeetha Nataka Akademi Award (1981). He died in 1990.

Personal life
He was born to Kaithari Raman Nambiar and Kutty Amma at Payyanur in 1919. He worked at All India Radio since 1944. He received Kerala State Awards for the stories, Thacholi Othenan and Kunjalimarakkar. He was married to Santha P. Nair, a popular Malayalam film playback singer in its early days. They have a daughter Latha Raju. Playback singer J. M. Raju is his son-in-law. His grandson Aalap Raju is also a playback singer.

Filmography

Dialogue
 Moodupadam (1963)
 Thacholi Othenan (1964)
 Kochumon (1965)
 Devatha (1965)
 Kadathukaaran (1965)
 Kunjaali Marakkaar (1967)
 NGO (1967)
 Vidhi (1968)
 Sandhya (1969)

Screenplay
 Thacholi Othenan (1964)
 Kochumon (1965)
 Devatha (1965)
 Kadathukaaran (1965)
 Kunjaali Marakkaar (1967)
 NGO (1967)
 Vidhi (1968)

Story
 Devatha (1965)
 Kadathukaaran (1965)
 Kunjaali Marakkaar (1967)
 NGO (1967)
 Vijayanum Veeranum (1979)

Direction
 Kochumon (1965)
 Devatha (1965)

References

External links

Malayalam film directors
Malayalam screenwriters
1919 births
1990 deaths
People from Kannur district
Screenwriters from Kerala
20th-century Indian film directors
20th-century Indian dramatists and playwrights
Writers from Kannur
Film directors from Kerala
20th-century Indian screenwriters
Recipients of the Kerala Sangeetha Nataka Akademi Award